St. Boniface Church is a historic Roman Catholic church building in Sublimity, Oregon, United States built in 1889.

Description
St. Boniface is construction in the Carpenter Gothic style of architecture, it is a massive six-bay wooden structure with lancet stained glass windows and a steep sloping roof. The cross-adorned steeple above its front entrance reaches to a height of 110 feet above the ground. A historic cemetery adjoins the church building on one side.

History
The first Catholics came to Sublimity in the 1870s. They were German immigrant farmers who came by rail from states like Minnesota, Wisconsin and Nebraska. Originally, services were held in private homes. The first priest, Fr. Peter Juvenal Stampfl, arrived in 1879. He made the first entry in St. Boniface's parish records on December 3, 1879.

St. Boniface Church is still an active parish in the Roman Catholic Archdiocese of Portland. Fr. Paul Materu is the current pastor.

References

External links
 St. Boniface Church (official website)
 Images of St. Boniface Catholic Church on Flickr

Churches in Marion County, Oregon
Carpenter Gothic church buildings in Oregon
Roman Catholic Archdiocese of Portland in Oregon
Roman Catholic churches in Oregon
Cemeteries in Oregon
1889 establishments in Oregon